The 2008 NCAA Division III men's basketball tournament was the 34th annual single-elimination tournament to determine the national champions of National Collegiate Athletic Association (NCAA) men's Division III collegiate basketball in the United States.

The field contained sixty-four teams, and each program was allocated to one of four sectionals. All sectional games were played on campus sites, while the national semifinals, third-place final, and championship finals were contested at the Salem Civic Center in Salem, Virginia.

Washington–St. Louis defeated defending champions Amherst in the championship, 90–68, clinching their first national title.

The Bears (25–6) were coached by Mark Edwards.

Troy Ruths, also from Washington–St. Louis, was named Most Outstanding Player.

Championship Rounds
Site: Salem Civic Center, Salem, Virginia

See also
2008 NCAA Division I men's basketball tournament
2008 NCAA Division II men's basketball tournament
2008 NCAA Division III women's basketball tournament
2008 NAIA Division I men's basketball tournament

References

NCAA Division III men's basketball tournament
Ncaa Tournament
NCAA Men's Division III Basketball